Jasper Yeuell (23 March 1925 – 2003) was an English professional footballer.

After emerging from the junior ranks of West Bromwich Albion, Yeuell signed professional forms with Portsmouth in 1946. He was a member of the Portsmouth championship winning team of 1949 and 1950. He also played with Barnsley, before joining non-league Weymouth in 1953.

External links

1925 births
2003 deaths
English footballers
West Bromwich Albion F.C. players
Portsmouth F.C. players
Barnsley F.C. players
Weymouth F.C. players
Association football defenders